Yulia Oleksandrivna Lutsyk (10 March 1990) is a Ukrainian rally co-driver.

Biography
Lutsyk was born in Novovolynsk in 1990 and moved with her family to Sansepolcro, Tuscany, Italy in 2003.

In the 2011 FIA Alternative Energies Cup season, with the sixth place obtained in the Ecorally San Marino - Città del Vaticano (together with the Albanian driver Desara Muriqi on Gonow GA200), she reached the best result for a female team in the history of the FIA Alternative Energies Cup. Lutsyk was also the first Ukrainian co-driver to gain points in an official FIA world championship.

See also
FIA Alternative Energies Cup

References

1990 births
Living people
Ukrainian rally co-drivers
FIA E-Rally Regularity Cup drivers
People from Novovolynsk